Acnodon senai is a species of serrasalmids found in South America. It is found in the Jari River basin in Brazil.

Etymology
The fish is named in the memory of fisheries worker Anazildo Mateus de Sena, Instituto Nacional de Pesquisas da Amazônia in Manaus, who collected the type specimen during one of his last trips to the field in June 1987.

References

Serrasalmidae
Fish of Brazil
Taxa named by Michel Louis Arthur Marie Ange François Jégu
Taxa named by Geraldo Mendes dos Santos
Fish described in 1951